The Washington Savings Bank was a New York City bank founded on April 22, 1897 and closed by New York State banking regulators on December 29, 1910 when bank President Joseph G. Robonovitch was indicted for grand larceny for stealing $90,000. Much excitement surrounded the morphine-addicted Robin's arraignment when he tried to commit suicide by taking poison. Four other bank officials were indicted for perjury for making false statements to bank regulators.

References

Defunct banks of the United States
Banks established in 1897
1897 establishments in New York City
Banks disestablished in 1910
1910 disestablishments in New York (state)
American companies disestablished in 1910
American companies established in 1897